The Alma Scots men's basketball program represents Alma College in men's basketball at the NCAA Division III level. They compete in the Michigan Intercollegiate Athletic Association (MIAA).

History

All MIAA athletes 
Cole Kleiver - 20-21; 21-22.

References

 https://almascots.com/sports/mbkb/index

External links
 

 
Basketball teams established in 1911
1911 establishments in Michigan